Glenburnie is an historic farm complex located between Shepherdstown, West Virginia and Shenandoah Junction, West Virginia. The house was built by James Glenn in 1802, completing the barn two years later.

The two-story center hall brick house has two rooms on one side of the hall, and one the full depth of the house on the other. The house is set on a rubble stone foundation. Unusually, it has north-facing windows on the gable end occupied by the large room. A -story kitchen was added in the 19th century. Three porches are also additions.

The stone bank barn is a major notable structure, built of the same stone rubble as the house's foundation.

References

Houses on the National Register of Historic Places in West Virginia
Houses in Jefferson County, West Virginia
Houses completed in 1802
Federal architecture in West Virginia
Farms on the National Register of Historic Places in West Virginia
National Register of Historic Places in Jefferson County, West Virginia